My December is the third studio album by American singer Kelly Clarkson. The album was released on June 22, 2007, through RCA Records. Clarkson confirmed the name of the album in her journal on her fanclub website on February 27, 2007.

Since its release, My December has shipped one million copies in the United States and has been certified platinum. It was also certified platinum in Canada. The album was voted as the fifth best album of 2007 by the readers of Billboard. It ranked at number 53 on the Australian year-end albums chart. The album was heavily reviewed by critics, who noted the album's stronger rock influence when compared with Clarkson's previous album Breakaway (2004).

Background

Development
Clarkson began writing and composing songs for My December during her international Breakaway World Tour. In an interview, Clarkson was quoted:

During this period, Clarkson wrote songs that would eventually become part of her album, My December, calling it "free therapy". These feelings inspired the song "Irvine", which tells of when she was in Irvine, California. "Irvine" would be later used in the season five premiere episode of One Tree Hill titled "4 Years, 6 Months, 2 Days". "Irvine" ends at a length of 4:15, leading to a minute of silence, followed by a three and a half minute hidden track entitled "Chivas".

Conflict with Sony BMG
Prior to the album's release, sources reported that Clive Davis, the head of Sony BMG, was dissatisfied with the album. Davis reportedly wanted Clarkson to make significant changes to the album, with some rumors claiming that he even wanted to delete the entire album, and have her record all new material. Clarkson reportedly refused to change any of the material. Initially, these reports were denied by representatives for both RCA and Clive Davis, with Davis specifically stating that Clarkson is "one of the top four artists at Sony-BMG" and wanted to ensure that she is treated as such.

Clarkson stated "I've sold more than 15 million records worldwide, and still nobody listens to what I have to say. I couldn't give a crap about being a star. I've always just wanted to sing and write."

American Idol judge Simon Cowell commented on the situation in an issue of Entertainment Weekly, saying:

The controversy fell quiet for a brief stint, but resumed when Clarkson cancelled her tour for My December and fired her manager, Jeff Kwatinetz. Kwatinetz, also the album's executive producer, had defended My December to Clarkson's label, saying:

Narvel Blackstock, Reba McEntire's ex-husband, was hired by Clarkson as her personal manager. In regards to her cancelled tour, disappointing ticket sales were acknowledged as a factor, and Clarkson stated that it (touring) was "too much too soon". Following the dismissal of her manager and cancelling her tour, Clarkson appeared in an issue of Elle, where it was revealed that Davis offered Clarkson $10 million to remove five songs from the album in favor of five more radio-friendly songs of Davis' choosing — including "Black Hole", which appeared on Lindsay Lohan's album, A Little More Personal (Raw). Clarkson refused the offer, and stated that:

Reba McEntire responded to the situation in the same magazine issue, praising Clarkson:

Further articles displaying Clarkson "downplaying" her record label were written. In an edition of USA Weekend, Clarkson stated:

Although American Idol judge Simon Cowell, who had sided with Clarkson earlier, seem to grow weary of the controversy, as he was quoted saying:

A few weeks after the release of My December, Clarkson publicly stated that all of the controversies regarding her "feud" with her label have been "blown way out of proportion". In a statement on her website, Clarkson stated:

Idol controversy
Some felt that Clarkson was shunned by Davis during his appearance on the finale show of American Idol season 6, when he proceeded to promote other Idol contestants' current singles or albums, but failed to mention Clarkson's upcoming My December album, or its first single "Never Again", and furthermore went out of his way to praise professional songwriters such as those who had written "Breakaway" and "Since U Been Gone". He did, however, briefly mention that Clarkson had sold over 15 million albums worldwide to date, when discussing the current state of Idol sales.

In addition, Clarkson claimed that she was pressured by her record label to sing "Never Again" at the charity event Idol Gives Back to promote the song, saying:

Instead, Clarkson sang Patty Griffin's "Up to the Mountain" at the Idol Gives Back special, getting a standing ovation, and saved "Never Again" for her appearance on the season finale show.

Release and promotion
My December was released on June 26, 2007 in North America. In numerous interviews and press releases, the release date for My December had been stated as July 24, 2007.

Clarkson had stated on Jimmy Kimmel Live! that the release date for My December had been pushed up, in an effort to allow fans to become familiar with the album before its upcoming promotional tour. The tour was then cancelled on June 14, 2007, with low ticket sales being acknowledged and Clarkson noting that it was "too much too soon". Clarkson rescheduled her tour to the fall of 2007 and performed in smaller venues than originally planned.

The album had been put up for pre-order on iTunes on June 12, including an offer from Ticketmaster for preferred seating to the upcoming tour. However, the offer was removed after the tour was cancelled. The album itself remained available for pre-order. A deluxe edition was also released with extra songs and a making of the album video.

Internationally, the album was released on June 23, 2007 in Australia and June 25, 2007 in the United Kingdom.

My December Tour

Clarkson announced on her website that the My December Tour would start on July 11, 2007 in Portland, Oregon. The tour had 37 dates across the US and Canada. Mat Kearney was scheduled to open for her and another possible special guest may have accompanied her.

However, on June 14, 2007, the tour was canceled. Live Nation CEO Michael Rapino released a statement:

Clarkson posted a response on her official website promising a new tour would happen:

A new My December Tour for Fall 2007 in North America was announced on September 4, 2007 on Billboard.com. Clarkson was scheduled to play 26 dates in 3,000-to-7,500 seat theatres rather than the previously scheduled arenas. The twenty city tour began in Verona, New York on October 10, 2007 and finished in Nashville, Tennessee on December 3, 2007.

When the second incarnation of the tour appeared on Ticketmaster, Jon McLaughlin was confirmed to be opening for Clarkson for the majority, if not all of her North America dates.

Singles
"Never Again" was released as the first worldwide single from My December. Clarkson confirmed its release on her official website on April 4, 2007 and debuted the song on Los Angeles' 102.7 KIIS-FM's radio show On-Air with Ryan Seacrest on April 13, 2007. The song was released on the iTunes Store on April 20, 2007 and was made permanently available for sale on April 24, 2007. It debuted and peaked at number eight on the Billboard Hot 100, but unlike her previous singles, it encountered radio resistance. Despite its poor radio airplay, the song logged an impressive number of over 100,000 paid digital downloads in its first week on the charts. As of May 2010, the song has sold over one million digital downloads.

Clarkson confirmed "Sober" as the second single from My December on her journal in the Official Kelly Clarkson Fan Club. The song was released to airwaves on June 6, 2007. Industry experts stated that "Sober" was a crucial single for Clarkson, as the lead single from My December, "Never Again", charted well due to strong digital downloads but encountered radio airplay resistance in a number of US markets, especially when compared to the radio success of all five of her singles from her previous album Breakaway. "Never Again" had been descending in radio airplay after failing to break the top 20 on the Pop format, and therefore was one reason why "Sober" was released so soon after "Never Again" (just over five weeks later, and three weeks before the release of the album). Whether radio accepted "Sober" was considered key in determining the sales potential of My December. After the failure of the song (Clarkson's least successful single in the US to date), sales of the My December album in the US largely ceased, and no further US singles from the album were released.

However, in an interview with Nashville radio station 107.5 The River, Clarkson said that she released "Sober" so early because she wanted to show the diversity of music in My December. In July 2007, "Sober" was a highlight of Clarkson's five-song set at Live Earth at Giants Stadium, with the audience audibly applauding her vocal line during the song's climax near the end. It has also been considered as a fan favorite from the album. "Sober" did have a featured spot in Clarkson's My December Tour, being played at the start of the encores and receiving a strong audience response. No music video was made for the song.

"One Minute" managed to gain airplay in Australia, which led the label to officially release it as the second single there. A CD single was released on September 22, 2007. However, it ultimately failed to make a major dent in Australia, debuting at number 36 on the charts before quickly exiting. "Don't Waste Your Time" was released as the third and final single. It was released in several European countries via iTunes in fall of 2007. It was released as a CD single in Germany in December 2007. It was also released in Australia in February 2008. A music video was released to promote the song and combined real-life images and computer animated graphics.

Critical reception

The first single, "Never Again", was released on April 13, 2007 in the US, debuting in the top ten of the Billboard Hot 100 thanks to strong digital sales. The album opened successfully; its opening week sales comparable to those of Clarkson's first two albums. It was suggested that so much controversy would have hindered the sales of Clarkson's then-new album. M. Tye Corner of AOL Music had opined early on that the controversy could "affect sales a bit in the first few weeks and when the record c[ame] out." In spite of the controversy surrounding My December, the album garnered fairly positive reviews from music professionals and critics. The album scored 64/100 on Metacritic, indicating generally positive reviews. Slant Magazine reviewed My December mostly positive, with the album receiving a 3.5/5 star review. An excerpt from the review, in response to the disappointing performance of "Never Again", read: "But who cares about hits—or appeasing the kids—when the songs are this good?" The Times wrote: "Clarkson has the moxie to rock without worrying about what anybody else thinks... Her gift is finding the source of vitality in absolute mainstream, people-pleasing pop, which by its nature breaks stylistic rules in favor of magpie mash-ups, bold appropriations and happy accidents."

AllMusic, however, gave a more lukewarm review, giving it 3/5 stars, saying: "It's what Kelly wanted to do, so on that level it's a success, and one that listeners who share her viewpoint (and quite likely her age) will respond to but for everybody else, My December is a disappointment." Commenting on Clarkson's feud with her record label, they also claimed: "My December proves that both camps were correct: Davis is correct that there are no big crossover hits here, yet it's also true that this is an artistic move that Clarkson needed to make. If left up to Davis, she would simply be another vocalist singing professional product." Rolling Stone, giving a similar lukewarm review, wrote: "Clarkson clobbers you over the head with her emotions and arena-ready choruses. The result is a record that's bland in some spots and annoying in others."

Legacy
A 2016 article from Sputnikmusic described My December as "the most logical progression for Kelly's career"; noting the album's genre-hopping between pop, pop punk, alternative rock, hard rock, soul, R&B, and folk without one genre sounding out of place, and further noting that "it would be really interesting to see if she ever makes an album like My December again". A 2017 article from AXS commemorating the ten-year anniversary of My December stated that "from My December was an album Clarkson made for herself and taught her more about not only herself but when to stand up for what she believes in. "It's my face, it's my time," she said of the record. During the feud, other artists jumped to her defense including Daryl Hall of Hall & Oates who also had a conflict with Davis during their run. To date, it still remains a favorite of fans."

Commercial performance
My December, in its debut, not only was one of the best selling albums of the week, but sold faster than Clarkson's previous album, Breakaway (which peaked at number three on the US Billboard 200 albums chart).  The album debuted at number two in the United States with sales of approximately 291,000 copies — a mere 6,000 copies less than Clarkson's debut hit Thankful sold in its first week. It came behind Hannah Montana 2: Meet Miley Cyrus, which sold about 326,000 copies that week.

The album also debuted at number two in the United Kingdom, selling 40,509 copies in its first week. The album eventually fell to number nine in its second week, and number twenty in its third week.

My December was certified platinum in the United States by the RIAA on the December 12, 2007. The album made it to number 66 on the US albums year-end-chart of 2007, while Clarkson herself was the sixty-third top selling artist of the year in the United States.

The album debuted and peaked at number four on the Australian ARIA Charts, falling off the Top 20 in five weeks. It fell off the charts after eighteen weeks.

As of September 2017, the album has sold 858,000 copies in the United States.

Track listing
All songs produced by David Kahne. All songs co-produced by Jason Halbert and Jimmy Messer.

Personnel 
 Kelly Clarkson – all vocals 
 Jason Halbert – keyboards, programming 
 David Kahne – keyboards, programming 
 Aben Eubanks – keyboards (8), programming (8), guitars (8, 9, 13), lap steel guitar (13)
 Jimmy Messer – guitars (1-12), bass (9, 11)
 Billy Mohler – bass (1, 2, 4-8, 10, 11, 13)
 Mike Watt – bass (3, 10, 12)
 Shawn Pelton – drums (1-12)
 Rob Brill – additional drum programming
 David Siskovic – additional beats

Orchestra on "Sober" and "Be Still"
 Mick Rossi – orchestrations, arrangements and conductor 
 Aaron Heick – alto saxophone 
 Andy Laster – baritone saxophone
 Andrew Sterman – tenor saxophone, conductor
 Erik Friedlander, Sara Seiver, Roger Shell and Wendy Sutter – cello
 Jeff Carney – double bass
 Cenovia Cummings, Joyce Hammann, Lori Miller, Antoine Silverman, Hiroko Taguchi, Entcho Todorov and Paul Woodiel – violin

Production 
 Kelly Clarkson – executive producer
 Jeff Kwatinetz – executive producer
 David Kahne – producer, engineer 
 Jason Halbert – co-producer
 Jimmy Messer – co-producer, additional engineer 
 Joe Barresi – engineer
 Chris Owens – assistant engineer
 Andy Wallace – mixing
 Mike Scielzi – mix assistant
 Bob Ludwig – mastering
 Jennifer Sousa – A&R, album coordinator 
 Brett Kilroe – art direction, design
 Vivian Ng – design 
 Chapman Baehler – photography
 Rachel Goodwin – make-up
 Campbell McAuley – hair stylist 
 Emma Trask – wardrobe stylist
 The Firm, Inc. – management 

Studios
 Recorded at Mower Studios (Pasadena, California); The Village Recorder (Los Angeles, California); Clinton Recording Studios and SeeSquared Studios (New York City, New York).
 Mixed at Soundtrack Studios (New York City, New York).
 Mastered at Gateway Mastering (Portland, Maine).

Charts

Weekly charts

Year-end charts

Singles

Note

Certifications

Release history

References

2007 albums
Albums produced by David Kahne
Kelly Clarkson albums
RCA Records albums
19 Recordings albums
Albums produced by Kelly Clarkson